The Massacre of Feodosia was a war crime by the Red Army against 160 wounded Wehrmacht POWs between December 29, 1941 and January 1, 1942. The massacre was notable for the relatively high number of victims and the "needless cruelty demonstrated" by the Red Army murderers, who froze victims into ice alive.

Background
On November 3, the city was captured by elements of the German 46th and 170th Infantry Divisions. On December 29, Soviet marine troops and regular infantry landed on the beach of Feodosia and captured the city. According to Alfred-Maurice de Zayas, "[A]n order was issued to kill every single German in Feodosia, whether wounded or not."

Discovery

On January 18, 1942, the Germans were able to reconquer Feodosia. De Zayas states,
 In some cases, their genitals were cut off. Twelve German soldiers survived the massacre hidden in cellars. Their testimony before the Wehrmacht War Crimes Bureau confirmed the number: Red Army soldiers murdered 160 wounded POWs.

On 21 March 1983, the West German Radio (WDR) broadcast a documentary which was based on de Zayas' investigation and also showed propaganda footage of the troops of the Wehrmacht on the Massacre of Broniki; witnesses to the massacre talked to journalists in the documentary.

See also
Battle of the Kerch Peninsula
Cryonics
Massacre of Broniki
Massacre of Grischino

References

Bibliography

Literature
Alfred de Zayas, Wehrmacht-Untersuchungsstelle
Franz W. Seidler, Verbrechen an der Wehrmacht

1941 in the Soviet Union
1942 in the Soviet Union
Activities on ice
Crimea in World War II
December 1941 events
Germany–Soviet Union relations
January 1942 events
Feodosia
Feodosia
Feodosia